Ramazan Çevik (born 1 April 1992) is a Belgian professional footballer of Turkish descent who plays as a winger for Turkish TFF Second League club Sarıyer.

References

External links
 

1992 births
People from Maaseik
Footballers from Limburg (Belgium)
Belgian people of Turkish descent
Living people
Belgian footballers
Belgium youth international footballers
Association football midfielders
Standard Liège players
Fortuna Sittard players
Antalyaspor footballers
Hacettepe S.K. footballers
Eyüpspor footballers
Sakaryaspor footballers
Samsunspor footballers
Kocaelispor footballers
Sarıyer S.K. footballers
Eerste Divisie players
Süper Lig players
TFF First League players
TFF Second League players
TFF Third League players
Belgian expatriate footballers
Expatriate footballers in the Netherlands
Belgian expatriate sportspeople in the Netherlands
Expatriate footballers in Turkey
Belgian expatriate sportspeople in Turkey